La gatta da pelare (A Hard Nut to Crack) is a 1981 Italian comedy film written, directed and starred by Pippo Franco. It is his only film as a director.

Plot 
A jealous cartoonist kills, in his comics, the psychoanalyst of his wife. When the murder happens in reality, he is the main suspect.

Cast 
 Pippo Franco as Stefano Valenti
 Janet Agren as  Germana
 Daniela Poggi as  Mara 
 Tuccio Musumeci as  Carlotti
 Orso Maria Guerrini as  Professor Maraldi 
 Nando Paone as  Donizetti
 Clara Colosimo as  Mother of Donizetti
 Giancarlo Magalli as   Carabinieri Captain

References

External links

1981 films
Italian comedy films
1981 comedy films
1981 directorial debut films
1980s Italian-language films
1980s Italian films